Suzanne is a 1980 Canadian drama film directed by Robin Spry. It was written by Spry and Ronald Sutherland as an adaptation of Sutherland's 1971 novel Snow Lark.

The film stars Jennifer Dale as Suzanne McDonald, a woman in an unhappy marriage who becomes pregnant after an extramarital affair with a gangster who has just been sent to prison. The cast also includes Gabriel Arcand, Winston Rekert, Ken Pogue, Michelle Rossignol, Michael Ironside, Aubert Pallascio, Pierre Curzi and Yvan Ducharme.

The film garnered six Genie Award nominations at the 2nd Genie Awards, including Best Actor (Rekert), Best Actress (Dale), Best Supporting Actor (Arcand), Best Adapted Screenplay, Best Cinematography and Best Costume Design.

References

External links 

1980 films
1980 drama films
Canadian drama films
English-language Canadian films
Quebec films
Films directed by Robin Spry
1980s English-language films
1980s Canadian films
English-language drama films